Automola atomaria is a species of fly in the genus Automola of the family Richardiidae. A. atomaria is found in Central America.

References

Tephritoidea
Insects described in 1830